Bugdom is a 1999 platform video game originally created by Pangea Software for Mac OS 9. It was included with the iMac DV 2000 and later iBook models. The Microsoft Windows version, released in 2000, was developed by Hoplite Research and published by On Deck Interactive, a division of Gathering of Developers. Bugdom was generally well received by critics, being praised for its graphics, gameplay and soundtrack but criticized for certain technical glitches as well as gameplay repetition, and sold fairly well.

Bugdoms story centers on the Bugdom, a kingdom inhabited by insects that appears as an outdoors bug environment. Originally, the kingdom was peacefully ruled by the rollie pollies and ladybugs, but not long ago, the kingdom was overthrown by the tyrannic and pompous King Thorax, leader of an evil clan of fire ants, as well as their evil follower bugs recruited prior to the kingdom's downfall. Thorax now rules the kingdom with an iron fist, and the ladybugs have been imprisoned in spider web cages scattered across the environment. The player assumes the role of Rollie McFly, who has survived the ambush of the kingdom by taking refuge in the lawn area. Rollie must travel to Thorax's anthill on the distant reaches of the Bugdom, while freeing various trapped ladybugs along the way. 

A sequel, Bugdom 2, was released on December 30, 2002.

In December 2020, an Opensource version of Bugdom that uses OpenGL was released for modern systems (MacOS X, Linux, Windows) by Iliyas Jorio with the approval of PangeaSoft. In February 2021, Jorio also released a ported version of PangeaSoft‘s game Nanosaur.

Gameplay
The game is set in an outdoors bug environment, in the Bugdom, a kingdom once ruled by bugs, namely the rollie pollies and ladybugs that was overthrown by a clan of fire ants who captured all of the Lady Bugs and held them as prisoners, leaving their leader, King Thorax, to rule the land. The player visits several colorful locations throughout the kingdom, namely a lawn (levels 1 and 2), a pond (level 3), a forest which resembles a bug's interpretation of a garden (levels 4 and 5), a beehive (levels 6 and 7), a nighttime-themed level (level 8), and an anthill (levels 9 and 10).

Players navigate through ten different stages as Rollie. Rollie has the ability to jump, kick, and roll, the latter two of which can be used to attack most hostile enemies. Nuts are scattered throughout the level which, upon being opened, have power-ups, keys, clovers, buddy bugs, or enemies. Gates can only be opened when Rollie has the appropriate colored key. Lady bugs are trapped at several points of each level and can be freed by kicking their web cages. When Rollie reaches the level exit, a hollow log to be exact, the players score is tallied based on the number of ladybugs freed, the number of clovers found, and if all four pieces of the blue clover has been found. In Level 9, if you found all 4 gold clovers in the entire game, which are levels 2, 6, 8, and 9, they will be tallied in that level.

PC version
The PC version was originally developed by Hoplite Research and published by On Deck Interactive, a division of Gathering of Developers. Following the acquiring of Gathering via Take-Two Interactive in 2002, the game was ported again by Ideas From the Deep. However, Take-Two Interactive apparently continued publishing illegal copies of Bugdom, prompting Ideas From the Deep to contact the FBI's crime division. Despite this, Take-Two Interactive continued to publish copies following the debate.

Creatures
Many insects are out to kill Rollie so he must survive and save the Bugdom. Some bugs help though.
Ladybugs - They once ruled the Bugdom with Rollie McFly until trapped in webs by the terrible minions of the anthill led by a giant ant in the name of Thorax. Now Rollie has to rescue them by kicking the web trap, making the beautiful bugs fly to safety. They appear in every level except level 7 and 10, the last two bosses.
Buddy bugs (bees) - These small striped bugs behind Rollie are like smart bombs that can immediately be shot on enemies, killing them. They come from nuts and are handy when Rollie is being attacked by multiple enemies. They appear in all of the levels.
Termites - These are minor enemies in the Bugdom that come from nuts. They appear in probably all of the levels.
Slugs - These large fat creatures are invincible, so they must be avoided. They appear in levels 1, 2, 3, and 8.
Boxer mantis - These green mantises wear boxing gloves. The player needs to kick or roll into them quickly, or Rollie is in for some pain. They appear in levels 1 and 2.
Spear throwing ants - These minions of King Thorax have ugly faces and spears. They must be attacked three times before they die. They also hate water. There's also a variety that throws rocks in levels 2 and 8. They appear in levels 1, 2, 4, 8 and 9.
Mosquitoes - These female flies attack Rollie from above and drain both his life and rolling energy, swelling their heads. Rollie must attack them when their noses are impaled in the ground. They appear in level 3.
Water hoppers - These buggers can be defeated only by buddy bugs and should be avoided at all costs. They appear in level 3.
Water spider - He is an aquatic taxi. If Rollie gives him a coin, the water spider will offer him a ride, making Rollie avoid the killer fish and frogs. He appears in level 3.
Killer fish - These fish eat Rollie, resulting in an instant kill. They can be avoided by riding the water spider. They appear in level 3.
Human feet - These pounding feet do big damage to Rollie, even if he runs into them from the side. They appear in level 4.
Spiders - These eight legged monsters drop down in front of Rollie. They attack by shooting webs and then bounce on top of Rollie when he is trapped. They've made webs that King Thorax's minion fire ants have trapped ladybugs in. One of them appears on the main menu. They appear in level 4 and 5.
Dragonflies - These green insects will offer Rollie a flight and can shoot fireballs (a spoof on actual dragons). They appear in level 4 and 5.
Bats - These mammals are a danger of riding the dragonfly. If the player flies over the wooden fence, a bat eats Rollie, resulting in an instant kill. They appear in level 4 and 5.
Caterpillars - These spiky creatures are like the slugs but bigger. They appear in level 4, 5 and 8.
Bees - These striped monsters follow Rollie wherever he goes. When they sting him, they die. They can be painlessly dispatched by rolling into them. They appear in level 4, 5, 6 and 7.
Bee grubs - These small white grubs with bee faces can be killed either by being kicked or being jumped on. They appear in level 6 and 7.
Drone bees - These muscular bees can fire their stingers but they die if they fire them. If Rollie is on the ball, they will try to pound their fists instead. They appear in level 6 and 7.
Queen bee - This giant bee can spew blobs of honey which generate many bees. When fighting her, avoid the shadows as they have spikes. Roll into her face to defeat her. Also, you can shoot buddy bugs at this female giant. She appears in level 7.
Fire ants - These elite soldiers of King thorax can fly and shoot fire. They can be defeated by using a buddy bug. They appear in level 8, 9 and 10.
Fireflies - If they see you in their flashing glow, these annoying creatures can carry Rollie off to somewhere that could kill him. They will explode if shot by a buddy bug. They appear in level 8.
Toxic gas roaches - These cockroaches have green gas masks that protect them from the toxic slime. In level 8, the gas they leave behind explodes if ignited by fire ants or buddy bugs, so they may die without Rollie having to fight them.
Ghost ants - If you kill a spear throwing ant in level 9, he will rise again as a ghost ant. He cannot be kicked but he will die if he is in lava or water. If you hide for a while, he will dissipate.
King Thorax - The game's final boss. The king of the fire ants can shoot sparks from his staff and to defeat him, Rollie will have to kick the water pipes so they quench the fire on his head, then kick him. After he repeats this process, King Thorax will fall and the game will be completed.

Reception

Pangea Software considers Bugdom to be their most popular Mac game. The Mac OS version of Bugdom received generally positive reviews, according to a 70% on GameRankings. Dziga Robilev of IGN rated Bugdom a 7/10, calling it "one of the best crafted platform games available for the Mac." However, Robilev also stated "The only thing holding this baby back is that the levels themselves don't offer enough variety. There is a lot of the same activity being performed over and over again. Still, the game is a fun play and younger gamers will definitely have a good time with it." MacMagazin rated the game a 6/6 Mac score, saying "We are sure: Bugdom will be the summer hit this year among the Mac games." iMacSidian rated the game a 5/5, saying "Bugdom really fills the huge gap of platform games for the Mac... The graphics are absolutely top notch - you have to see it to believe it." Mac Gamer's Ledge rated the game a 4.5 out of 5 score, calling it "a feast for the eyes and ears." AppleLinks called the game's musical score "fantastic" and called the game "one of the first games that really can be enjoyed by both children and adults." Inside Mac Games rated the game a 4/5, saying "Bugdom is certainly a great game... and it is good enough to rival many of the Nintendo 64 and PlayStation titles that it is similar to. Its easy-to-grasp controls and interface are almost totally transparent, even to new users, and the feel of the game is just plush and polished - as is the look."

Sequel
A 2002 sequel, Bugdom 2, stars a grasshopper named Skip who attempts to retrieve his stolen knapsack from a large Bully Bee. As of March 1, 2002, it has sold over 30,000 copies worldwide, prompting Pangea to rerelease the game as a shareware release.

See also
 Truform, rendering technology used in Bugdom

References

External links
 Official page

Pangea Software
1999 video games
Classic Mac OS games
Video games about insects
Video games developed in the United States
Windows games
Platform games
Single-player video games